The Ginetta G32 is a mid-engined sports car built by British car manufacturer Ginetta Cars from 1989 to 1992.

Specification
The G32 is a two seater mid-engined coupe and convertible, designed by Ivor Walklett. The car incorporated many Ford parts including interior and doors from the Ford Fiesta. It is a compact car 3.76m long, and 1.65m wide. A total of 115 were produced.

The 1.6i is powered by a 4-cylinder (1597cc) Ford engine developing  and  torque. The 1.9i model, powered by a 4-cylinder (1905cc) engine, develops  and  torque. Both versions are fitted with a 5-speed manual gearbox.

A 1.6 turbo version was tested but was not put into production.

References

Rear mid-engine, rear-wheel-drive vehicles
Cars introduced in 1989
1990s cars
Ginetta vehicles
Cars discontinued in 1992